Peter Baumgartner may refer to:

 Peter Baumgartner (cinematographer) (born 1939), Swiss cinematographer
 Peter Baumgartner (footballer), Swiss former footballer
 Peter Baumgartner (ice hockey) (born 1991), German ice hockey player
 Peter Baumgartner (businessman), Swiss businessman and CEO of Etihad Airways